John Shorten (17 March 1886 – 18 April 1972) was an Irish Gaelic footballer who played as a full-back for club side Lees and at senior level for the Cork county team from 1908 until 1915.

Career

Murphy first came to sporting prominence as a rugby union player with Cork Constitution. He later switched codes to Gaelic football and joined the Lees club with whom he won four County Championship titles. Success at club level saw Murphy drafted onto the Cork senior football team and he lined out in the 1907 All-Ireland final defeat by Dublin. Murphy won a Munster Championship medal in 1911 but was unable to play, in spite of being selected, in Cork's subsequent All-Ireland final victory over Antrim. He continued to line out with Cork until 1915.

Personal life and death

Born in Ballingeary, County Cork, Murphy was educated at Presentation Brothers College, Cork and later took an appointment in the road department in Cork County Council.

Shorten died in at his home on the Commons Road in Cork on 18 April 1972.

Honours

Lees
 Cork Senior Football Championship: 1907, 1908, 1911, 1914

Cork
 Munster Senior Football Championship: 1911

References

1886 births
1972 deaths
Cork inter-county Gaelic footballers
Gaelic footballers who switched code
Lees Gaelic footballers